Clonglash is a townland some two miles (3 km) east of Buncrana on the Inishowen Peninsula in County Donegal, Ireland

Clonglash is part of the townland that also includes Bauville and Keeloges.

External links
 Bauville Keeloges and Clonglash at logainm.ie

Townlands of County Donegal